Autism with port-wine stain syndrome is a very rare genetic disorder which is characterized by the unilateral presence of a port-wine stain, autism/autistic-like behaviour that is associated with social awkwardness, developmental delays, and language/speech delay, and epilepsy. Additional findings include generalized cerebral glucose hypometabolism. It has been described in four un-related children.

References 

Genetic diseases and disorders